Sychevsky is a rural locality (a khutor) in Vishnyakovskoye Rural Settlement, Uryupinsky District, Volgograd Oblast, Russia. The population was 63 as of 2010.

Geography 
Sychevsky is located in forest steppe, 29 km northeast of Uryupinsk (the district's administrative centre) by road. Verkhnetseplyayevsky is the nearest rural locality.

References 

Rural localities in Uryupinsky District